Kondraty  is a village in the administrative district of Gmina Goraj, within Biłgoraj County, Lublin Voivodeship, in eastern Poland.

The village has a population of 204.

References

Villages in Biłgoraj County